Khangchengyao is a mountain peak located at  north-west of Yumesodong, North Sikkim in the Eastern Himalayas.

Location 
Khangchengyao is a revered peak among the locals. It is the 4th highest peak in Sikkim and 10th highest peak in India. As per folklore, Khangchengyao is known as the Male Deity.

References 

Mountains of Sikkim
Six-thousanders of the Transhimalayas